Walter William Lyon (1 October 1879 – 3 January 1964) was an Australian rules footballer who played with Melbourne in the Victorian Football League (VFL).

Notes

External links 

1879 births
1964 deaths
Australian rules footballers from Victoria (Australia)
Melbourne Football Club players